Keokuk  is a city in and a county seat of Lee County, Iowa, United States. It is Iowa's southernmost city. The population was 9,900 at the time of the 2020 census. The city is named after the Sauk chief Keokuk, who is thought to be buried in Rand Park. It is in the extreme southeast corner of Iowa, where the Des Moines River meets the Mississippi. It is at the junction of U.S. Routes 61, 136 and 218. Just across the rivers are the towns of Hamilton and Warsaw, Illinois, and Alexandria, Missouri. Keokuk, along with the city of Fort Madison, is a principal city of the Fort Madison-Keokuk micropolitan area, which includes all of Lee County, Iowa, Hancock County, Illinois and Clark County, Missouri.

History

Situated between the Des Moines and Mississippi rivers, the area that became Keokuk had access to a large trading area and was an ideal location for settlers. In 1820, the US Army prohibited soldiers stationed along the Mississippi River from having wives who were Native American. Dr. Samuel C. Muir, a surgeon stationed at Fort Edwards (near present-day Warsaw, Illinois), resigned his commission rather than leave his Indian wife and crossed the river to resettle. He built a log cabin for them at the bottom of the bluff, and became the area's first white settler. 
 
As steamboat traffic on the Mississippi increased, more European Americans began to settle here. Around 1827, John Jacob Astor established a post of his American Fur Company at the foot of the bluff. Five buildings were erected to house workers and the business. This area became known as the "Rat Row".

One of the earliest descriptions of Keokuk was by Caleb Atwater in 1829:

The settlement was part of the land designated in 1824 as a Half-Breed Tract by the United States Government for allotting land to mixed-race descendants of the Sauk and Fox tribes.  Typically children of European or British men (fur traders and trappers) and Native women, they were often excluded from tribal communal lands because their fathers were not tribal members. Native Americans considered the settlement a neutral ground. Rules for the tract prohibited individual sale of the land, but the US Congress ended this provision in 1837, creating a land rush and instability.

Centering on the riverboat trade, the settlement continued to grow. The village became known as Keokuk shortly after the Blackhawk War in 1832. Why residents named it after the Sauk chief is unknown. Keokuk was incorporated on December 13, 1847.

Barnard States Merriam was elected mayor in 1852 and reelected in 1854.

In 1853, Keokuk was one of the centers for outfitting additional immigrant Latter-Day Saints pioneers for their handcart journey west; 2,000 Christian Latter-Day Saints passed through the city.

Keokuk was the longtime home of Orion Clemens, brother of Samuel Clemens, better known as Mark Twain. Samuel's visits to his brother's home led him to write of the beauty of Keokuk and southeastern Iowa in Life on the Mississippi.

At one time, because of its position at the foot of the lower rapids of the Mississippi, Keokuk was known as the Gate City. During the American Civil War, Keokuk became an embarking point for Union troops heading to fight in southern battles. Injured soldiers were returned to Keokuk for treatment, so several hospitals were established. A national cemetery was designated for those who did not survive. After the war was over, Keokuk continued its expansion. A medical college was founded, along with a major-league baseball team, the Keokuk Westerns, in 1875.

In 1913, Lock and Dam No. 19 was completed nearby on the Mississippi River. The population of Keokuk reached 15,106 by 1930. During the last half of the 20th century, Keokuk became less engaged in Mississippi River trade and more dependent on jobs in local factories. The town celebrated 150 years in 1997.

Geography
Keokuk is in Iowa's southeast corner along the Mississippi River and just northeast of the Des Moines River. Hamilton, Illinois, lies to the east across the Mississippi on U.S. Route 136.

Climate
Keokuk has a humid continental climate. It is known for having recorded the highest temperature ever in Iowa, on July 20, 1934.

Demographics

2010 census
As of the census of 2010, there were 10,780 people, 4,482 households, and 2,818 families residing in the city. The racial makeup of the city was 91.9% White, 4.0% African American, 0.2% Native American, 0.8% Asian, < 0.1% Pacific Islander, 0.3% from other races, and 2.8% from two or more races. 1.8% of the population were Hispanic or Latino of any race.

There were 4,482 households, out of which 31.1% had children under the age of 18 living with them, 43.3% were married couples living together, 14.4% had a female householder with no husband present, and 37.1% were non-families. 32.1% of all households were made up of individuals, and 15.9% had someone living alone who was 65 years of age or older. The average household size was 2.36 and the average family size was 2.94.

Population spread: 24.4% under the age of 18, 8.3% from 18 to 24, 23.1% from 25 to 44, 26.7% from 45 to 64, and 17.4% who were 65 years of age or older. The median age was 40 years. For every 100 females, there were 88.4 males. For every 100 females age 18 and over, there were 86.6 males.

2000 census
As of the census of 2000, there were 11,427 people, 4,773 households, and 3,021 families residing in the city. The racial makeup of the city was 92.87% White, 3.90% African American, 0.27% Native American, 0.52% Asian, 0.01% Pacific Islander, 0.45% from other races, and 1.99% from two or more races. 1.09% of the population were Hispanic or Latino of any race.

There were 4,773 households, out of which 29.9% had children under the age of 18 living with them, 46.8% were married couples living together, 13.2% had a female householder with no husband present, and 36.7% were non-families. 32.4% of all households were made up of individuals, and 16.2% had someone living alone who was 65 years of age or older. The average household size was 2.35 and the average family size was 2.97.

Population spread: 25.4% under the age of 18, 8.6% from 18 to 24, 25.5% from 25 to 44, 22.9% from 45 to 64, and 17.7% who were 65 years of age or older. The median age was 38 years. For every 100 females, there were 88.4 males. For every 100 females age 18 and over, there were 83.9 males.

The median income for a household in the city was $31,586, and the median income for a family was $39,574. Males had a median income of $31,213 versus $21,420 for females. The per capita income for the city was $17,144. 11.9% of the population and 8.1% of families were below the poverty line. Out of the total population, 15.7% of those under the age of 18 and 13.4% of those 65 and older were living below the poverty line.

Education 
The Keokuk Community School District has two elementary schools (George Washington, and Hawthorne), Keokuk Middle School, and Keokuk High School. Several additional elementary schools have been closed over the years (Torrence, Lincoln, Garfield, Wells Carey, and Jefferson).  The middle school was damaged by a fire in 2001 and replaced by a new school on a lot next to the high school.

Private education is provided by Keokuk Catholic Schools (St. Vincent's School) and Keokuk Christian Academy. Keokuk Catholic previously had a senior high school division, Cardinal Stritch High School; in 2006 it merged into Holy Trinity High School in Fort Madison.

Keokuk is also home to a campus of Southeastern Community College.

A few miles north of Keokuk is the Galland School, a replica of the first schoolhouse constructed in Iowa.

Arts and culture

Attractions

Lock and Dam No. 19
The Mississippi River lock and dam along with the hydroelectric power plant, owned and operated by Ameren Missouri, were built in 1913. They still use most of the original equipment. When the plant began operation in August 1913, it was the largest single powerhouse electric generating plant in the world. 
It is part of the Keokuk Lock & Dam, both of which are visible from a park at the foot of the commercial district. Built in 1913, the old lock was too small to serve the newer, larger barges.  It was replaced in 1957 with a 1200' x 110' lock.  At the time of construction in 1913, this was the longest dam in the world, with the longest transmission line and the highest voltage in the world.  The Chief Engineer was Hugh L. Cooper.

Grand Theater
Designed by Merle F. Baker, the Grand Theatre was constructed on the foundation of the Keokuk Opera House (c. 1880), which burned down in 1923. Modeled after theaters in Chicago, it was praised as one of the finest theaters in the country at the time. The Grand Theatre is owned by the city of Keokuk and used as a performing arts center. The theatre has housed many historically important performers over the years, including John Philip Sousa and Maynard Ferguson.

Other Attractions
 Keokuk National Cemetery
 Keokuk Veteran's Memorial
 Miller House Museum
 annual American Civil War reenactment
 George M. Verity River Museum.

In popular culture 
Keokuk is mentioned among funny place names by Krusty the Clown in The Simpsons sixth-season episode "Homie the Clown".

Sports
Keokuk has deep baseball history that started in 1875 when the Keokuk Westerns played in the National Association. On May 4, 1875, the Westerns and the Chicago White Stockings (today's Chicago Cubs) played the first professional baseball game in Iowa. The Keokuk Indians minor league team played in the Iowa State League (1904-1907), Central Association (1908-1915), Mississippi Valley League (1929-1933) and Western League (1935). After the Indians (1904-1915, 1929-1933, 1935), Keokuk was home to the Keokuk Pirates (1947-1949), Keokuk Kernels (1952-1957), Keokuk Cardinals (1958-1961) and the Keokuk Dodgers (1962). The team was an affiliate of the St. Louis Cardinals, Pittsburgh Pirates, Cleveland Indians and the Los Angeles Dodgers. Notable players included baseball pioneer Bud Fowler, 1961 Home Run Record Holder Roger Maris, Player/Announcer Tim McCarver and three time World Series Champion with the New York Yankees Jack Saltzgaver.

Keokuk is nicknamed "The Racing Capital of the World" and "Home of Champions" for having many racing drivers win races and championships. Don White was the first driver to impact nationally; he won the 1954, 1955 and 1958 IMCA national championships. White's brother-in-law Ernie Derr won the 12 IMCA national championships between 1953 and 1971. White helped Dick Hutcherson get started; Hutcherson won the 1963 and 1964 IMCA championship before moving to NASCAR and finishing second in points. Ramo Stott won the 1970 and 1971 ARCA and 1976 USAC Stock Car championships. White, Derr, Hutcherson, and Stott were nicknamed "The Keokuk Gang". Ron Hutcherson, Dick's brother, also competed nationally.

Notable people 
Dr. Henry Erdman Radasch 1874-1942 Professor of Embriology and Histology at Daniel Baugh Institute of Anatomy at Jefferson Medical College

 Edward P. Alexander, author, historian, and educator
 Herman C. Baehr, 36th Mayor of Cleveland, Ohio
 William H. Clagett, politician
 Orion Clemens, first and only secretary of Nevada Territory and brother of Mark Twain
 William Lane Craig, analytic philosopher and Christian apologist
 Samuel Curtis, military officer
 Mary Fels, philanthropist, suffragist, Georgist
 Bud Fowler, first professional African American baseball player
 Nathaniel Lyon Gardner, botanist, born in Keokuk
 Jerry Harrington, baseball player
 James B. Howell, newspaper editor and U.S. Senator, resided in Keokuk
 Howard Hughes, aviator, engineer, industrialist, film producer and director, and philanthropist
 Howard R. Hughes, Sr., businessman and inventor; father of Howard Hughes
 Rupert Hughes, novelist, screenwriter, film director, historian; uncle of Howard Hughes
 Dick Hutcherson, stock car driver
 Ron Hutcherson, stock car driver
 John N. Irwin, Governor of Idaho Territory (1883) and of Arizona Territory (1890–1892)
 Edward Kimball, actor
 Lloyd Steel Lourie, orthodontist
 Elsa Maxwell, gossip columnist, socialite
 Edward Joseph McManus, U.S. federal judge and Lieutenant Governor of Iowa (1959 – 1961)
 Grace Medes,  biochemist
 Samuel Freeman Miller, Supreme Court justice
 Conrad Nagel, actor and a founder of the Academy Awards 
 Richard Page, lead vocalist and bass player for the band Mr. Mister
 George Pomutz, Union Army officer and diplomat
 Mike Pyle, NFL player
 Palmer Pyle, NFL player
 John M. Rankin, Iowa state legislator and judge
 Hugh T. Reid, Union Army general
Jack Saltzgaver, Major League Baseball Player New York Yankees and Pittsburgh Pirates
 Jeremy Soule composer of video game soundtracks
 Frank Steunenberg, Governor of Idaho (1897–1901)
 Ramo Stott, stock car driver
 James Vandenberg, football quarterback
 Don White, stock car driver
 Verner Moore White, artist, painted oil of Keokuk presented to President Theodore Roosevelt
 Annie Turner Wittenmyer, social reformer and relief worker

See also

Local landmarks
 Church of All Saints
 Gen. William Worth Belknap House
 Gen. Samuel R. Curtis House
 E. H. Harrison House
 Hotel Iowa
 John N. and Mary L. (Rankin) Irwin House
 C. R. Joy House
 Keokuk National Cemetery
 Keokuk Rail Bridge
 Keokuk-Hamilton Bridge
 Keokuk Young Women's Christian Association Building
 Lock and Dam No. 19
 Justice Samuel Freeman Miller House
 St. John's Episcopal Church
 Hugh W. and Sarah Sample House
 The Park Place-Grand Avenue Residential District
 U.S. Post Office and Courthouse
 Alois and Annie Weber House
 Frank J. Weess House

References

Further reading

For a depiction of Keokuk during its early boom years see:
Michael A. Ross, "Cases of Shattered Dreams: Justice Samuel Freeman Miller and the Rise and Fall of a Mississippi River Town," Annals of Iowa, 57 (Summer 1998): 201-239.

External links
 

 City of Keokuk
 "National Register Properties", Keokuk Tourism Website
 Keokuk.com A portal into what is available in Keokuk Iowa
 "History of Keokuk", Keokuk Web site
 George M. Verity Riverboat Museum
 HAER - Mississippi River 9-Foot Channel, Lock & Dam No. 19, Upper Mississippi River, Keokuk, Lee County, IA, Library of Congress
 
 City Data Comprehensive Statistical Data and more about Keokuk

 
Cities in Iowa
Cities in Lee County, Iowa
County seats in Iowa
Iowa populated places on the Mississippi River
Lowest points of U.S. states